Wellington Luís de Sousa (born 11 February 1988), commonly known as Wellington, is a Brazilian professional footballer, who plays as a striker for Shonan Bellmare.

Career 
Wellington started his professional career in 2007 with Sport Club Internacional. In the same year, he was lent to São Caetano.

He played for Náutico in 2008 also on loan, before Wellington left Internacional for TSG 1899 Hoffenheim on 7 August 2008. He played only 18 games and was loaned out to FC Twente on 31 August 2009.

On 6 July 2010, he was loaned out to Fortuna Düsseldorf in the 2. Bundesliga. He made his debut in the DFB-Pokal match against TuS Koblenz on 15 August 2010 and scored his first goal – a wide distance shot from 35 meters – as a substitute during a 1–2 defeat against Hertha BSC Berlin on 30 August.

In the winter break, he returned to Brazil, transferring to Figueirense on loan.

On 2 August 2012, his contract until June 2013 at 1899 Hoffenheim was terminated in mutual consent. After playing for EC Pelotas in the first half of 2013, he was acquired by Shonan Bellmare.

Career statistics

Honours 
FC Twente
Eredivisie: 2009–10

Shonan Bellmare
J2 League: 2014

Vissel Kobe
Emperor's Cup: 2019

References

External links
 
 
 
 Profile at Vissel Kobe

1988 births
Living people
People from Ourinhos
Brazilian footballers
Association football forwards
Sport Club Internacional players
Associação Desportiva São Caetano players
Clube Náutico Capibaribe players
TSG 1899 Hoffenheim players
FC Twente players
Fortuna Düsseldorf players
Figueirense FC players
Goiás Esporte Clube players
Shonan Bellmare players
Associação Atlética Ponte Preta players
Avispa Fukuoka players
Vissel Kobe players
Botafogo Futebol Clube (SP) players
Bundesliga players
2. Bundesliga players
Eredivisie players
J1 League players
J2 League players
Brazilian expatriate footballers
Expatriate footballers in Germany
Expatriate footballers in the Netherlands
Expatriate footballers in Japan
Brazilian expatriate sportspeople in Germany
Brazilian expatriate sportspeople in the Netherlands
Brazilian expatriate sportspeople in Japan
Footballers from São Paulo (state)